Timperley is an electoral ward of Trafford, Greater Manchester, covering the western part of Timperley.

Councillors 

 indicates seat up for re-election.
 indicates by-election.

Elections in the 2020s

May 2022

May 2021

Elections in 2010s

May 2019

May 2018

May 2016

May 2015

May 2014

May 2012

May 2011

May 2010

Elections in 2000s

May 2008

May 2007

May 2006

November 2004 (by-election)

May 2004

May 2003

May 2002

May 2000

Elections in 1990s

Elections in 1980s

Elections in 1970s

References

External links
Trafford Council

Wards of Trafford
1974 establishments in England